Cymindis accentifera is a species of ground beetle in the subfamily Harpalinae. It was described by Zoubkoff in 1833.

References

accentifera
Beetles described in 1833